Artisans of Leisure is a luxury travel company offering private cultural tours in international destinations. The company offers tours in 70 countries on six continents.

History 
Artisans of Leisure was founded in 2003 by Ashley Isaacs Ganz. Food & Wine magazine has named Ganz a luxury travel “tastemaker,” and Departures magazine  featured Ganz in their "Explorers" issue.

Artisans of Leisure was ranked the best tour operator in the world in Travel + Leisure magazine's World's Best Awards and has appeared on the Top 10 Tour Operators list in the Travel + Leisure World’s Best Awards readers’ survey multiple times. Condé Nast Traveler magazine regularly selects Artisans of Leisure for their list of Top Travel Specialists. In their annual survey that rates travel companies according to client satisfaction, quality of service, sustainability, education, and other criteria, National Geographic Adventure magazine named Artisans of Leisure one of the best luxury travel outfitters in the world. National Geographic Traveler has named the company's tours to their 50 Tours of a Lifetime in multiple years. Trade publication Recommend said, “Travel industry insiders go as far as saying that Artisans of Leisure hasn’t merely raised the bar when it comes to private touring—they claim Artisans of Leisure is the bar.” The company's tours have been listed in the Condé Nast Traveler magazine Dream List repeatedly. Artisans of Leisure tours have been recommended by The New York Times, Condé Nast Traveler, Travel + Leisure, Forbes, NBC’s Today show, CNN, Frommer's, Fodor’s, and other major newspapers, magazines, guidebooks, affluent market studies and trade publications.

Products and services
Artisans of Leisure specializes in luxury Foreign Independent Travel (FIT) and arranges tours with a cultural focus in 70 countries.

The company also offers special-interest tours focusing on various themes, such as culinary tours, family tours, art and architecture tours, active travel, garden tours, tours for travelers with food allergies and dietary restrictions, and religious heritage tours. The company also designs one-of-a-kind international honeymoons and offers a honeymoon registry.

Artisans of Leisure is noted for incorporating specialized experiences into their tours, such as philanthropic activities, specialized shopping excursions, special lessons and classes such as Japanese tea ceremony and Italian cooking, and innovative activities for families, couples and groups of friends.

Notes

References
 Aarons, Felice & Kelly, Shannon (2007). “Guided Tours” and “Culinary Tours.” Fodor’s Shanghai (1st ed.), p. 257. 
 “The Art of Exploration.” (September 2006). Luxury Travel Advisor, p. 64
 “Ask T+L/Ask an Expert” (September 2011). Travel + Leisure, p. 28
 Bennett, Andrea & Bunting, Chris (March 15, 2005). “The A-Team.” New York Post
 Bobb, Brooke (November 19, 2015). “5 Exotic Culinary Vacations Where It’s All About the Food.” Vogue.com
 “Budapest: Bottoms Up.” (June 2007). Fodors.com
 Carmichael, Karen (May/June 2011). “50 Tours of a Lifetime.” National Geographic Traveler
 Clemence, Sara (November 30, 2013). “The Off Duty 50: Holiday Gift Guide.” The Wall Street Journal
 Connelly, Marjorie (August 21, 2005). “Leaf Peeping in Japan and Luggage Service *Along Hadrian's Wall Trail.” The New York Times, Travel section
 Cormier, Ray (March 7, 2004). “Design and Gardens in Japan.” The New York Times, Travel section
 “Culinary Travel Award 2014: All Winners – Best Culinary Tours” (July 2014). Saveur
 Dizik, Alina (August 12, 2015). “More Parents Vacation With One Child at a Time, and Leave the Siblings Home.” The Wall Street Journal
 Doherty, Mike (October 2012). “The Story Behind The Stuff: Consumers' Growing Interest In ‘Real’ Products.” Fast Company
 Donelson, Sophie (Spring 2007). “Travel Intell.” 100 Thousand Club, pp. 94–95
 Dumenco, Simon (Summer 2009). “Vision Quest – Why Culture Is Travel's Latest Holy Grail.” The New York Times – T Magazine, p. 12
 Flint, Sunshine (June/July 2012). “Top 10 Family Trips.” Worth, p. 133
 Ford, Elise Hartman (February 3, 2008). “Tour Operators: What they do, how to find them and why you want one.” The Washington Post, p. 10
 Gold, Sarah (January/February 2013). “Exotic Culinary Tours.” Departures
 “Good Trips: Dance” (September/October 2011). AFAR, p. 66
 Guilmet, April (January 12, 2015). “Cruelty-free Luxury Is Not an Oxymoron.” Fortune.com
 Johansen, Heidi Leigh (Ed.) (2007). “Guided Tours.” Fodor's Beijing (1st ed.), p. 241. 
 Johanson, Mark (November 13, 2015). “Once-in-a-lifetime Trips.” CNN.com
 Jordan, Michele Anna & Brady, Susan (2006). The World is a Kitchen: Cooking Your Way Through Culture – Stories, Recipes, and Resources. pp. 268, 277, 279. Palo Alto, CA: Travelers’ Tales. 
 Kaplan, Michael (Fall 2006). “Savoring the World.” Celebrated Living, pp. 96, 98
 Kelly, Margaret (Ed.) (2012). “Special-interest Tours.” Fodor's Australia (21st ed.), p. 738. 
 Kelly, Margaret (Ed.) (2011). “Guided Tours.” Fodor's China (7th ed.), p. 780. 
 Loftus, Margaret (May–June 2010). “50 Tours of a Lifetime: The Year of Adventure.” National Geographic Traveler, pp. 91–92
 Loftus, Margaret (May–June 2011). “50 Tours of a Lifetime: Going Deep, Getting Personal.” National Geographic Traveler, p. 90
 McLaren, Sally & Zatko, Martin (2014). “Agents and Operators.” The Rough Guide to Japan (6th ed.), p. 32. 
 Minarcek, Andrea (July 30, 2013). “Adventure Travel 2013: Top New Trips to Emerging Places.” USAToday.com
 Murphy, Jen (May 2013). “Cooking & Culinary Tour: 4 Hands-on Food Experiences.” AFAR, p. 80
 Pounder, Sibeal (December 15, 2013). “Little League: Philanthropic Tourism.” Financial Times –  How To Spend It
 Richmond, Simon & Dodd, Jan (2011). “Agents and Operators.” The Rough Guide to Japan (5th ed.), p. 28. 
 Roberts, Chuck & Motamed, Nilou (August 31, 2006). “Trips That Will Change Your Life.” CNN Headline News
 Roberts, Sophy & Story, Richard David (October 2012). “A Guide to the Mediterranean: Insiders to Consult, Villas to Rent and Advice on Getting There.” Departures
 Reiber, Beth (2006). “Escorted Tours.” Frommer’s Tokyo (9th ed.).  p. 35. 
 Sardone, Susan Breslow (November 2007). “Honeymoons/Romantic Travel: Top 5 Tour Operators.” About.com
 Sherman, Lauren (February 21, 2008). “Asia’s Sumptuous Resort Spots.” Forbes.com
 Smith, Sarah (March/April 2010). “What $500 Buys in…” Departures, p. 40
 “Spectacular Spain.” (January 2006). Luxury Travel Advisor, p. 52
 “The Insider's Guide – The Fixers (Asia).” (October 2011). Departures, p. 112
 Thursfield, Celia (May 2014). “Asia Section – Intro to Seoul.” Condé Nast Traveller (UK)
 “Tips & Trips: New for Newlyweds.” (August 20, 2004). The New York Sun, Travel, p. 1
 Trefler, Caroline (Ed.) (2011). “Tours.” Fodor's Spain, p. 863. 
 “Trips of a Lifetime” (June/July 2011). Worth, p. 137
 Willis, Gerri & Cole, Jennifer (September 30, 2006). “Artisans of Leisure Immerse Guests in Local Culture.” CNN Open House
 Winick, Kate (December 2011). “Ashley Isaacs Ganz Designs Your Dream Trip from Poolside in Istanbul.” BlackBook

External links 
 Artisans of Leisure

Travel and holiday companies of the United States
Companies based in New York City